Owlamchi (also Romanized as Owlāmchī and Ūlāmchī) is a village in Ajorluy-ye Sharqi Rural District, Baruq District, Miandoab County, West Azerbaijan Province, Iran. At the 2006 census, its population was 360, in 70 families.

Name 
According to Vladimir Minorsky, the name of this village is derived from the Mongolian language and means "purveyor of relay horses".

References 

Populated places in Miandoab County